Letterkenny Rovers Football Club is an association football club from Ireland, currently competing in the Ulster Senior League. The club is based in Letterkenny and the team play their home games at Leckview Park.

The club work closely with League of Ireland Premier Division side Finn Harps. Letterkenny Rovers also compete in the FAI Senior Cup.

History
The club was formed in 1936 as Letterkenny Crusaders before being given its current name in 1954.

At the end of 2006, the club began preparation for an application for a semi-professional license to compete in the new A Championship but the Championship was cancelled at the end of the 2011 season. However, in 2010, the club erected a new 200 seater stand at Leckview Park in phase one of the re-development of the venue.

The 2015/2016 season saw Rovers, under the guidance of Eamon McConigley, achieve notable success. Having overcome Derry City Reserves to win the Knockalla Caravans Cup, the first-team went on to reach the final of the FAI Intermediate Cup at the Aviva Stadium, going down 5-0 to Crumlin United.

Current squad

Club officials
Source:

Management

Colours and badge
Letterkenny Rovers home kit is white jersey, black shorts, red socks. The away kit are black jersey, white shorts and yellow socks.

The club crest is divided into four panels which feature St Eunan's Cathedral, Conwal Parish Church, a fish and a bridge. There is a football in the centre of the crest.

Honours
Ulster Senior League
Winners: 2004–05, 2009: 2 
FAI Intermediate Cup
Runners-up: 2015–16: 1

References

External links
https://www.letterkennyroversfc.ie
 Letterkenny Rovers Civic Reception hosted by the Mayor
 New U-21 Manager
 Fanad Utd Beat Letterkenny Rovers

 
Association football clubs in County Donegal
Organisations based in Letterkenny
Ulster Senior League (association football) teams
1936 establishments in Ireland
Association football clubs established in 1936